The Commonwealth Railways NSU class was a class of diesel-electric locomotives built in 1954 and 1955 by the Birmingham Railway Carriage and Wagon Company, England, for the Commonwealth Railways to be deployed on the narrow-gauge Central Australia Railway and North Australia Railway.

The need

By the end of World War II, the Commonwealth Railways were operating a diverse, worn-out collection of rolling stock on their  narrow-gauge Central Australia Railway and North Australia Railway, and on their  standard-gauge Trans-Australian Railway. Steam locomotives hauled both freight and passenger trains, and they had become very unreliable. On the two narrow-gauge lines that comprised the truncated north–south routes along which huge amounts of materiel and troops had been carried during the war, some of the locomotives had 50 or more years of use. Their condition had been worsened in the harsh outback environment through constant jolting – the track was lightweight and much of it had been laid on bare earth 60 years earlier. After post-war economic restrictions had moderated, in 1950 the Federal Government provided funding for the Commonwealth Railways to replenish its fleet of both narrow and standard gauge locomotives and rolling stock.

Tenders
A call for tenders issued for 14 diesel locomotives for the Commonwealth Railways narrow-gauge lines included some important criteria:
axle loading of no more than 10.5 tonnes, in order to operate over lightweight rail of 41, 50 and 60 pounds per yard
electric transmission
three-axle bogies
tractive effort of at least 21,000 pounds
ability to operate in extreme conditions, with temperatures in excess of 45 °C, poor quality water, and dry, dusty air heavily laden with sand.

Thirteen companies submitted more than 30 designs. However, most tenders did not get past the first stage of the selection procedure because they did not address all the specifications, such as electrical transmission. One important factor was the Chief Mechanical Engineer's preference for the locomotives to have engines in the lower-revolution range, which was expected to lower maintenance costs. The engine in the winning tender, by the Birmingham Railway Carriage and Wagon Company Ltd, was a Sulzer plant with an idling speed of 750 rpm. By contrast, a design submitted by A.E. Goodwin ran at 1500 rpm.

The decision to award the contract to the Birmingham Railway Carriage and Wagon Company in 1951 was a departure from the Commonwealth Railways' practice of purchasing "well proven" designs, exemplified by its choice of General Motors diesel-electric locomotives for its standard-gauge operations. The British company had a long history of building rail vehicles but this order was its first for locomotives. However, Sulzer had 42 years of experience in locomotive design and Sulzer plants had been used widely in the UK since the early 1930s. Any doubt was resolved by the purchase contract stipulating that Sulzer Bros (London) Ltd would accept full responsibility for the design and performance of the completed locomotives.

The Sulzer engine
The LDA series engine, which had its origins in the 1920s, was specifically designed for use in railway applications, although an unfounded belief persisted that it originated in marine applications, as had the engines of the WAGR X class.

In service
The NSU class locomotives were instrumental in the Commonwealth Railways assessment, four years after their introduction, that operating costs on the Central Australia Railway had fallen by 60 per cent.

The first locomotives to be unloaded at Port Adelaide were NSU52 on 10 May 1954 and NSU51 ten days later. They were immediately put to use for crew training. Still temporarily mounted on standard-gauge bogies on which it had been trialled in the UK, NSU51 was unveiled at Port Augusta on 12 June 1954 with nameplates showing George McLeay (whose portfolio included the Commonwealth Railways) on the cab sides.

On 26 June 1954, locomotives 51 and 52 worked the first diesel-hauled northbound  Ghan into Alice Springs – timed to coincide with a visit of Prime Minister Robert Menzies. The last of the class was commissioned in August 1955.

It was initially expected that the new locomotives would be able to complete a 1370 kilometre round trip from Oodnadatta to Alice Springs on one tank of fuel. This proved to be impracticable and a 91,000-litre fuel tank was installed at Alice Springs. Minor faults with voltage regulators and air and oil filtration systems were quickly rectified, and the design went on to earn a reputation as an efficient and robust unit. But the NSUs were very primitive. Crews reported, for example, that the spring-loaded, 18-notch throttle handle stayed in the selected position when new, but as it wore, it would swing unpredictably and cause the train to lurch violently.

Initially the fleet worked out of Port Augusta on the narrow gauge. Following the construction of the standard-gauge Marree railway line in 1957, which more or less ran parallel to the Central Australia Railway between Port Augusta and Marree, two were transferred to the North Australia Railway operating out of Darwin. During the next 17 years, locomotives were swapped periodically between the two lines.

In July 1975, all the locomotives were included in the transfer of Commonwealth Railways to Australian National.

The NSU fleet remained intact until the Central Australia Railway was superseded by the opening of a new standard-gauge line to Alice Springs in 1980. Two were then transferred to Gladstone for use on the Wilmington line and one to Peterborough for use on the Quorn line. Several others were used by rail retrieval contractors along the Central Australian Railway after it closed. The last was withdrawn in 1987.

Livery
The class spent their entire service with their bodies painted in Commonwealth Railways maroon and silver, and bogies (except for a pair of silver-painted standard-gauge bogies) in black.

Preservation
No members of the class were condemned in revenue service. , two (NSU52 at the Pichi Richi Railway and NSU58 at Old Ghan Heritage Railway and Museum) were operating; NSU55, at Steamtown Heritage Rail Centre, was potentially operable although it had not been used for more than a decade; two were displayed indoors; and the remainder were either stored or displayed outdoors, most of them bogie-mounted body shells from which components had been removed. Further details are below.

Gallery

Notes

References

Further reading

External links

  Pichi Rich Railway

A1A-A1A locomotives
BRCW locomotives
Commonwealth Railways diesel locomotives
Railway locomotives introduced in 1954
3 ft 6 in gauge locomotives of Australia
Diesel-electric locomotives of Australia
Streamlined diesel locomotives